The Classic Car Club of America (CCCA) is an organization founded in 1952 to celebrate the grand automobiles of the prewar period. At the time, the vehicles covered by the club were considered too modern to be of any interest by such organizations as the Antique Automobile Club of America and despite their often stupendous cost when new, were considered practically worthless.

Currently, the CCCA membership vehicles are among the most valuable on the market.

Definition of a Classic car
In the words of the CCCA:

A CCCA Classic is defined as a "fine" or "distinctive" automobile made in the United States or abroad between 1915 and 1948. Generally, a Classic was expensive when new and was produced in small numbers. Other variables, such as engine displacement, custom coachwork, and luxury features such as power brakes, power clutch, and "one-shot" or automatic lubrication systems, also contribute to determining whether a vehicle is classified as a Classic.

The CCCA is considered to have invented the term classic car, which was coined to describe the vehicles covered by the club's interest. While the term is nowadays used to describe any interesting old vehicle, many in the US consider it only properly used to describe vehicles considered eligible for the CCCA. This may be considered analogously to the correct usage of 'Classical music' to mean only from a specific historical period, even though many people use the term to mean any orchestral work.

However,  a Los Angeles car buff attorney, Robert Gottlieb,  coined the term "classic car" in his 1951 Motor Trend columns,  for the cars many people considered white elephants,  then languishing on the back rows of used car lots in any city.   Today,  excluding "associate members,"  aka wives,  the CCCA has only 2,500 members,  about its membership in the 1970s.

In order to avoid ambiguity, the CCCA generally refers to classic cars that are eligible for the CCCA 'CCCA Full Classics', 'CCCA Classics', 'Full Classics', or just capitalizes them as 'Classics'.

The CCCA has a narrow focus, tending to be interested only in the high-priced cars available in a limited time period. Racing cars and serious sports cars are not covered by the CCCA, either.

Eligible vehicles 

The Classic Car Club of America publishes an officially sanctioned list by makes and models of Approved CCCA Classic Cars. Some makes that are not very well represented in the club are accepted on a "Considered by application" basis. A Club member may petition to have a vehicle not listed in Approved CCCA Classic Cars approval and accepted. Such approval may be given if the car is one of a similar standard to vehicles already accepted into the club.

However, the CCCA's list of "Classics" is arbitrary, accepting all eight-cylinder Auburns, an assembled Buick/Hudson product, but not the non-Imperial Chrysler eights of the same era, which also featured full-pressure-oiled engines, hydraulic brakes, and overdrive beginning before the rest of the industry in 1934, and were arguably as attractive as the Auburn pre-Airflow models. Nonetheless, the Club deserves kudos for standing firm and refusing to include post-1948 automobiles, despite persistent demand from owners of newer automobiles seeking to bolster their nests with the imprimatur of the "Classic" moniker.

Cars manufactured prior to 1915 may be approved if they are nearly equivalent or basically identical to eligible vehicles manufactured in 1915 or later. Cars built after 1942 and up to 1948 are only accepted if they are nearly identical or fundamentally identical to prewar vehicles; while the club's emphasis is on pre-war vehicles, this acknowledges that many cars built immediately post-war were in fact identical to those available immediately before hostilities began.

On its website, the Classic Car Club of America maintains a list of Approved CCCA Classic Cars that are acknowledged CCCA Classics.

Grand Classics 
The CCCA's car shows and judged championships are known as Grand Classics and are held at various points throughout the US. About a half-dozen Grand Classics are held annually. While neither as large nor as glamorous as the largest Concours d'Elegance such as Pebble Beach they are prestigious events in their own right.

While many cars go to be entered into the competition, the Club encourages its members to bring their cars even if they are in no condition to win at the show.

Concours judging is based on a comparison of the car to its condition when new. If the car now is identical to its as-new condition (or indeed better, given the quality of modern restoration) then 100 points are awarded. These days, quite a few vehicles rate 100 points at the show.

Some alterations for safety purposes are permitted and do not cost judging points. Glass must be safety glass except in classes purely for unrestored, as-original cars. Many original vehicles from early in the period had only one tail light and stop light; fitting a second one is accepted as long as it looks period correct. Equipping a car built with only brakes on two wheels with brakes on the other two wheels is also permitted, as long it is done in keeping with the car's period.

Caravans 
The CCCA organizes annual driving tours under this name. Distances covered are often scenic and leisurely, with many stops at local attractions.   These events could be as long as several weeks, or as short as 3 days depending on the focus of the tour.

Complete car list 
All vehicles below must be built between 1915 and 1948, unless specified otherwise.
 AC 
 Adler (by application)
 Alfa Romeo
 Alvis (Speed 20, Speed 25, and 4.3 L)
 Amilcar (by application)
 Armstrong Siddeley (by application)
 Aston Martin (all 1927-39)
 Auburn (all 8- and 12-cylinder)
 Austro-Daimler 
 Ballot (by application)
 Bentley
 Benz
 Blackhawk
 BMW (327/318, 327, 328, and 335)
 Brewster (all heart front)
 Brough-Superior (by application)
 Bucciali (TAV 8, TAV 30, TAV 12 and Double Huit)
 Bugatti (All except Type 52)
 Buick (1931-42 — 90 Series and 80 Limited)
 Cadillac (All V-12 and V-16; All 1925-35; 1936-48 — All 63, 65, 67, Cadillac Series 70, 72, 75, 80, 85, 90 Series; 1938-47 — 60 Special; 1940-47 — All Series 62)
 Chenard-Walcker (by application)
 Chrysler (1926-30 — Imperial 80, 1929 Imperial L; 1931-37 — Imperial Series CG, CH, CL, and CW Newports and Thunderbolts;1934 — CX; 1935 — C-3; 1936 — C-11; 1937-48 — Custom Imperial, Crown Imperial Series C-15, C-20, C-24, C-27, C-33, C-37, C-40)
 Cord
 Cunningham (Series V6, V7, V8, and V9 race cars built by Briggs Cunningham)
 Dagmar (6-80)
 Daimler (All 8- and 12-cylinder)
 Darracq (8-cylinder and 4-litre 6-cylinder)
 Delage (model D-8)
 Delahaye (Series 135, 145, 165)
 Delaunay Belleville (6-cylinder)
 Doble
 Dorris
 Duesenberg
 DuPont
 Excelsior (by application)
 Farman
 Fiat (by application) 
 FN (by application)
 Franklin (All models except 1933-34 Olympic)
 Frazer-Nash (by application)
 Georges Irat
 Graham (1930-31 — Series 137)
 Graham-Paige (1929-30 — Series 837)
 Hispano-Suiza (All French models; Spanish models T56, T56BIS, T64)
 Horch
 Hotchkiss (by application)
 Hudson (1929 — Series L)
 Humber (by application)
 Invicta
 Isotta Fraschini
 Itala
 Jaguar (1946–48 —  L,  L (Mark IV))
 Jensen (by application)
 Jordan (Speedway Series Z, as well as 1929–31 Jordan 8, various model designations of G, 90 and Great Line 90)
 Julian
 Kissel (1925-26; 1927 — 8-75; 1928 — 8-90 and 8-90 White Eagle; 1929-31 8-126)
 Lagonda (All models except 1933-40 Rapier)
 Lanchester (by application)
 Lancia (by application)
 LaSalle (1927-33)
 Lincoln (All L, KA, KB, and K; 1941 — 168 H; 1942 — 268 H; All Lincoln Continentals)
 Lincoln Continental
 Locomobile (All models 48 and 90; 1927-29 — Model 8-80; 1929 — 8-88)
 Marmon (all 16-cylinder; 1925–26 — 74; 1927 — 75; 1928 — E75; 1930 — Big 8; 1931 — 88 and Big 8)
 Maserati (by application)
 Maybach
 McFarlan (TV6 and 8)
 Mercedes
 Mercedes-Benz (All 230 and up, as well as Benz models built prior to the merger, 1926-26 10/30 h.p., 16/50 h.p., and 16/50 h.p. Sport.; K., S., S.S., S.S.K., S.S.K.L.; Grosser and Mannheim)
 Mercer
 MG (1935-39 SA; 1938-39 WA)
 Minerva (All except 4-cylinder)
 N.A.G. (by application)
 Nash (1930 Series 490; 1931 Series 8-90; 1932 Series 9-90, Advanced 8 and Ambassador 8; 1933-34 Ambassador 8)
 Packard (All 12 cylinder; 1925–34 All 6- and 8-cylinder; 1935 Models 1200–1205, 1207 and 1208; 1936 Models 1400–1405, 1407 and 1408; 1937 Models 1500–1502, 1506–1508; 1938 Models 1603–1605, 1607 and 1608; 1939 Models 1703/5/7/8; 1940 Models 1803–1808; 1941 Models 1903–1908; 1942 Models 2023, 2003–2008, 2055; 1946-47 Models 2103, 2106 and 2126; All Darrin-bodied)
 Peerless (1925 Series 67; 1926 — 1928 Series 69; 1930-1 Custom 8;1932 Deluxe Custom 8)
 Peugeot (by application)
 Pierce-Arrow 
 Railton (by application)
 Raymond Mays (by application)
 Renault (45 hp)
 REO (1931-4, all Royale 8-cylinder)
 ReVere
 Roamer (1925 8-88, 6-54e, 4-75 and 4-85e; 1926 4-75e, 4-85e and 8-88; 1927-29 8-88; 1929-30 8-120)
 Rochet-Schneider (by application)
 Rohr (by application)
 Rolls-Royce
 Ruxton
 Squire
 S.S. Jaguar (1932-40 S.S. 1, S.S. 90, SS Jaguar and SS Jaguar 100)
 Stearns-Knight
 Stevens-Duryea
 Steyr (by application)
 Studebaker (1928 — 8, FA and FB President, 1929-33 President except Model 82)
 Stutz
 Sunbeam (8-cylinder and 3 L twin cam)
 Talbot (105C and 110C)
 Talbot-Lago (150C)
 Tatra (by application)
 Triumph (Dolomite 8 and Gloria 6)
 Vauxhall (25-70 and 30-98)
 Voisin
 Wills Sainte Claire 
 Willys-Knight (Custom bodied only, considered by application)

References

External links
Official website
List of Approved CCCA Classics

Other Classic Car Clubs
Antique Automobile Club of America
The Antique & Classic Car Club of Canada

1952 establishments in the United States
Non-profit organizations based in Illinois
Motor clubs
Clubs and societies in the United States
Des Plaines, Illinois
Conservation and restoration of vehicles